The 1993 Wickes British Open was a professional ranking snooker tournament, that was held from 22 February to 6 March 1993 at the Assembly Rooms in Derby, England. ITV televised the event from 27 February.
 
Steve Davis won the tournament by defeating James Wattana ten frames to two in the final. The defending champion Jimmy White was defeated in the semi-final by Davis.


Prize fund
The breakdown of prize money for this year is shown below:

Winner: £50,000
Final: £25,000
Semi-final: £12,500
Quarter-final: £7,000
Last 16: £3,500
Last 32: £2,000
Last 64: £1,000

Last 96: £450
Last 128: £200
Last 192: £100
Stage one highest break: £800
Stage two highest break: £2,000
Total: £250,000

Main draw

Final

References

British Open (snooker)
1993 in snooker
1993 in British sport